Antena 1 may refer to:

Antena 1 (Portugal), a Portuguese radio station
Antena 1 (Romania), a Romanian TV channel